Charles Town (born 1796 at Sutton Valence, Kent; died 31 July 1845 at Sandgate, Folkestone, Kent) was an English amateur cricketer who played first-class cricket from 1815 to 1823. Mainly associated with Kent, he made three known appearances in first-class matches.

References

1796 births
1845 deaths
English cricketers
English cricketers of 1787 to 1825
Kent cricketers
People from Sutton Valence